The Insurmountable (German: Der Unüberwindliche) is a 1928 German silent adventure film directed by Max Obal and starring Luciano Albertini, Vivian Gibson and Paul Henckels. It was shot at the Staaken Studios in Berlin. The film's sets were designed by the art directors Botho Hoefer and Hans Minzloff.

Cast
 Luciano Albertini as Silvio Spaventa  
 Hilda Rosch as Rina Pera  
 Paul Henckels as H. van Teen, Juwelier & Jim  
 Vivian Gibson as Heloise  
 Hermann Picha as Sunny, ein Faktotum  
 Carl Geppert as Polizeirat Hellberg  
 Alexander Sascha as Grand  
 Harry Grunwald as Big  
 Hans Wallner as Liska  
 Robert Garrison as Farmer  
 Grace Chiang as O-Nana-San  
 Alfred Loretto as Polizeiwachtmeister Grigoleit 
 Heinrich Gotho

References

Bibliography
 Bock, Hans-Michael & Bergfelder, Tim. The Concise Cinegraph: Encyclopaedia of German Cinema. Berghahn Books, 2009.

External links

1928 films
Films of the Weimar Republic
German silent feature films
Films directed by Max Obal
German black-and-white films
Films shot at Staaken Studios